D4 or Kiyevsko-Gorkovsky Diameter is the fourth line of the Moscow Central Diameters which will open beginning in 2023–2024.

Stations

References 

 
Moscow Railway
Railway lines in Russia